Faktum is a street newspaper sold by homeless people in Gothenburg, and other cities in southern Sweden. It is the equivalent of Situation Sthlm in Stockholm, Aluma in Malmö, Lund and Helsingborg, and The Big Issue in English-speaking countries.

The paper was founded in 2001.

In 2006 it was awarded the grand prize of the Swedish Publicists' Association (Publicistklubben) together with its sister papers Situation Sthlm and Aluma.

See also
List of street newspapers
Homelessness in Sweden

References

External links 
 (archived)

Street newspapers
Newspapers published in Sweden
Mass media in Gothenburg
2001 establishments in Sweden
Publications established in 2001
Monthly newspapers